Cariniana is a genus of trees in the family Lecythidaceae, first described as a genus in 1842.  The entire genus is native to South America. Many are of importance for timber production. Species of this genus may be known commonly as jequitibá.

Species

Formerly included 
(moved to other genera: Allantoma, Couratari)

References

 
Ericales genera
Flora of South America
Taxonomy articles created by Polbot